Ultimate Airport Dubai is a documentary television series which airs on international versions of the National Geographic Channel in more than 170 territories, and available in 45 languages. The program was commissioned by National Geographic Channels International and is produced by Arrow Media.

The series is set in Dubai International Airport and follows staff who are employed at the airport and keep the facility operating, including air traffic controllers, customs officials, ground staff and service personnel. Discussions with the airport operators about being allowed to produce the series began in January 2012.

The first season was filmed from September 2012 to February 2013 and consisted of ten episodes. It premiered on September 5, 2013 in selected regions. The series was renewed following strong ratings globally and locally and a ten-episode second season premiered on December 11, 2014. A third ten-episode season was commissioned on June 12, 2015.

Episodes

Season 1 (2013)

Season 2 (2014)

Season 3 (2015)

Broadcast
The series premiered on National Geographic Abu Dhabi and selected international versions of the National Geographic Channel globally on September 5, 2013. The second season premiered in selected markets globally, including the United Kingdom on October 29, 2014 with two episodes airing back-to-back.

In Australia, season 1 premiered on September 17, 2013 on National Geographic Channel Australia. Season 2 premiered on December 7, 2014.

The third season premiered in Italy on October 5, 2015, in Australia on October 7, 2015, across Asia on October 8, in South Africa on October 15 and the UK on October 28, 2015.

References

External links

2013 American television series debuts
2015 American television series endings
Documentary television series about aviation
Dubai International Airport
English-language television shows
National Geographic (American TV channel) original programming
Television shows filmed in the United Arab Emirates
Television shows set in the United Arab Emirates